The Lac de Maine Stadium is a multi-purpose stadium located in Angers, France. 

The stadium includes a number of facilities: it has four football fields, a synthetic hockey field, a grass rugby field, an 400m athletic track with 8 lanes, and a jump runway (for track) with two landing pits.

Notable events 
The Stade du Lac de Maine has hosted the French Athletics Championships in 2005, 2009, 2012, and 2016. In 2014, the stadium hosted DécaNation, an annual track and field competition.

References 

Athletics (track and field) venues in France
Football venues in France
Sports venues in Maine-et-Loire
Buildings and structures in Angers
Sport in Angers